The 1948–49 Iraq FA Baghdad First Division was the first season of the Iraq Central FA League (the top division of football in Baghdad and its neighbouring cities from 1948 to 1973). The competition started on 5 November 1948, after the fixture list had been drawn up at a meeting between club representatives held at the Al-Malaki club.

The Iraq Central Football Association (IFA) intended to hold the league in a double round-robin format, but this was changed to a single round-robin after several games had to be postponed due to rainy weather. The IFA also set a rule that players who had already played for one club in a league game could not play for another team without prior permission from the League Committee, however Montakhab Al-Shorta and Wizarat Al-Maarif were found to have broken this rule.

The title-deciding match between Al-Kuliya Al-Askariya Al-Malakiya and Al-Haras Al-Malaki was played on 16 April 1949 at Al-Kashafa Stadium. Al-Haras Al-Malaki needed to win outright in order to overtake their opponents and win the title, but the game ended 3–3 and therefore Al-Kuliya Al-Askariya Al-Malakiya were crowned inaugural league champions.

League table from known results
The following is not the final league table, but is the most recent league table published by The Iraq Times newspaper as at 11 December 1948, with the added inclusion of the four known results that took place after this date.

Known results

References

External links
 Iraqi Football Website

Iraq Central FA League seasons
Iraq
1948 in Iraqi sport
1949 in Iraqi sport